Joan Dougherty (2 March 1927 – 18 December 2020) was a Canadian politician in the province of Quebec.

Biography
Born in Montreal, Quebec, to Edward Mason, a physician, and Loretta O'Reilly, Dougherty studied at The Study, a private girls' school, and received a Bachelor of Science degree in 1947 and a Masters in histology in 1950 from McGill University. She did post-graduate studies at the Massachusetts Institute of Technology in biophysics.

Dougherty represented Jacques-Cartier in the National Assembly of Quebec from 1981 to 1987.

She died from COVID-19 during the COVID-19 pandemic in Quebec.

References

1927 births
Anglophone Quebec people
2020 deaths
McGill University Faculty of Science alumni
Politicians from Montreal
Quebec Liberal Party MNAs
Women MNAs in Quebec
Deaths from the COVID-19 pandemic in Canada